Cold Water Cowboys is a Canadian documentary/reality series developed by Tyson Hepburn and John Driftmier. It aired on  Discovery Channel Canada for 34 episodes and 4 seasons from 2014 to 2017. The show was filmed in Newfoundland and tells the story of six local captains and their crews.

Outside Canada the show is known as Cold Water Gold (National Geographic UK and international) and  Cold Water Captains (The Weather Channel). It is available globally on Netflix under its original title.

Synopsis 
Set in several locations of Newfoundland and Labrador, Cold Water Cowboys shows the life of fishermen after the Collapse of the Atlantic northwest cod fishery in 1992. Those who remained in business had to switch to crab, shrimp, turbot, herring, mackerel and other species. The show has a local flavour and some episodes have subtitles to explain Newfoundland English. Richard Gillett, one of the show's captains, said the show is not only about fishing but also about "the communities and the families and the relationships between the fishermen and the communities."

History 

The Cold Water Cowboys concept was developed by a Canadian producer Tyson Hepburn and director John Driftmier who were friends since film school. In fall 2012, the two went to Twillingate to film a demo reel and discovered fifth-generation fisherman Richard Gillett. For 10 days when Driftmier worked at St. John's, Hepburn filmed Gillett's team and their work.

Hepburn and Driftmier produced a demo reel in late 2012 and presented it to David Paperny who agreed to produce the show with Cal Shumachter and Audrey Mueler at Paperny Entertainment. The concept received support from Discovery's vice president Ken MacDonald and director of commissioning, Edwina Follows. A month before the shooting, Driftmier died in a plane crash in Kenya filming Dangerous Flights, so Hepburn and the team continued without him.

The first season was shot in Newfoundland between April and September 2013 with the filming crew spending up to 3 week aboard. Cold Water Cowboys premiered at midnight February 25, 2014, gathering one of the highest first-week ratings in Discovery Canada's history.

Season 2 premiered on March 10, 2015, adding newcomers Andre and Michelle Jesso, and Morris Anstey. For the launch Discovery developed an HTML5 fishing simulator video game Atlantic Empire with characters from the show.

Season 3 premiered on March 8, 2016 with a new captain Rick Crane joining the show. Returning captains were Andre and Michelle Jesso, Conway Caines, Paul Tiller, Richard Gillett and Morris Antsey.

Season 4 premiered on April 18, 2017 and featured Paul Tiller, Morris Anstey and Rick Crane. New captains on the show were father-son team of Calvin Kerrivan and Kurtis and Lee Pond.

Controversies
Midnight Shadow Captain Richard Gillet was arrested in October 2015 and convicted in September 2016 for the assault of a dock worker while filming season 2 of the show. He received a conditional discharge and a year of probation in court.

Gillet received national attention in April 2017 when he staged a hunger strike in front of the federal Department of Fisheries and Oceans building in St. John's to protest against the actions of the DFO in its governance of fisheries. As the vice-president of the Federation of Independent Sea Harvesters of Newfoundland and Labrador, he demanded a meeting with the fisheries minister over quota cuts to shrimp and crab.  The hunger strike lasted 11 days and ended with Gillet being taken to the hospital. In September 2017, Gillett was fined $14,000 for the 3 violations of the Fisheries Act in 2016.

Another star of the show,  Nicole Daniels captain Toby Young faced charges in August 2015 for failing to comply with the condition of a fishing license. In August 2016 Sebastian Sails''' captain Morris Anstey faced charges for an assault committed the same month. In February 2017, he was convicted and sentenced to 12-months probation period.

 Awards and nominations 
In 2015 the show was nominated for the 3rd Canadian Screen Awards at "Best Factual Program or Series" category but lost to the Ice Pilots'' show.

Cast

Episodes

References

External links
 
 “Cold Water Cowboys” page at Discovery Canada

Discovery Channel (Canada) original programming
Television shows filmed in Newfoundland and Labrador
Fishing television series
Fishing in Canada
2014 Canadian television series debuts
2017 Canadian television series endings
2010s Canadian reality television series
English-language television shows
Television series by Entertainment One